Chalcombe Road Halt was a railway station on the link line between the Great Central Railway and the Great Western Railway's Birmingham - London line, leaving the Great Central at Culworth Junction to connect with Banbury Junction. The station, which served the nearby Northamptonshire village of Chacombe, opened in 1911 and closed in 1956.

History 
In 1893, the Manchester, Sheffield and Lincolnshire Railway (MS&LR) obtained Parliamentary approval for the extension of its line from Annesley in Nottingham to London. The final section of the extension saw the line connect with Metropolitan Railway's line at Quainton Road before returning to MS&LR metals at Finchley Road and continuing to Marylebone. Negotiations with the Metropolitan regarding running rights over its line came to deadlock prompting Sir William Pollitt, the MS&LR's general manager, to reach agreement with the Great Western Railway in March 1896 for a route to London via Banbury which would avoid the Metropolitan.

The route had no intermediate stations but soon became an important freight route with 60,796 wagons exchanged between the MS&LR (now known as the Great Central) and the Great Western within the first six months of operation; by 1904 this figure had risen by 50%. Two passenger services each way were initially provided by the Great Western, with the Great Central later supplementing this service with three additional trains in each direction. The link was subsequently used for cross-country services, including Aberdeen to Penzance, Oxford to Leicester and Newcastle to Bournemouth.

A small halt (situated between Chacombe and Coton Farm) was opened on 17 April 1911 and named Chalcombe Road Halt. Serving a rural area, the halt closed on 6 February 1956, and the line itself closed on 4 September 1966.

References 

Disused railway stations in Oxfordshire
Former Great Central Railway stations
Railway stations in Great Britain opened in 1911
Railway stations in Great Britain closed in 1956
1911 establishments in England